Salvador Palha (born Lisbon, 14 April 1984) is a Portuguese rugby union footballer. He plays as a lock.

Currently a member of Direito squad, he was called by Tomaz Morais for the 2007 Rugby World Cup finals, to replace the injured Marcello d'Orey. Palha played in the 14-10 loss to Romania.

Palha had 18 caps for the "Lobos", from 2007 to 2010, without ever scoring.

External links
Salvador Palha International Statistics

1984 births
Living people
Portuguese rugby union players
Portugal international rugby union players
Rugby union locks
Rugby union players from Lisbon